The AMD Professional Gamers League (PGL), founded around 1997, was one of the first professional computer gaming eSports leagues. The PGL was run by Total Entertainment Network and was sponsored by AMD. The first professional tournament they held was for StarCraft in September 1997. The league was official unveiled at a press conference at Candlestick Park in San Francisco on November 3, 1997.  It was sponsored by Microsoft, Nvidia, and Levi Strauss & Co. The organization raised over $1.2mil USD in sponsorship money.

Nearly 1,400 players took part in the first Quake tournament, which took place online. The first-ever Professional Gamers League Finals took place on January 30 and January 31, 1998, in Seattle, Washington at the Sega GameWorks super-arcade.  Two games were played in this competition, Command & Conquer: Red Alert and Quake.  Both tournaments featured 1 on 1 play with David "DeepBlue" Magro winning the Red Alert tournament and Dennis "Thresh" Fong winning the Quake tournament.  Both players won $7,500 and new AMD computers.

Season 3 hosted the first ever Starcraft World Championship where 128 players from around the globe competed online from August 14 - September 6, 1998. The final 8 competitors played live in San Francisco, CA. Jay "Gadianton" Severson took first place playing random and going undefeated in the double-elimination bracket to win $8500 and a new AMD computer.

In 2000, Gamers.com acquired the PGL from Pogo.com, after PGL had been inactive for a year.

See also
 Guillaume "Grrrr..." Patry, StarCraft: Brood War player who got 3rd in 1998, later went on to be the only non-Korean to win an OnGameNet Starleague tournament
 Cyberathlete Professional League - similar esports league

References

1997 establishments in Washington (state)
Defunct esports competitions
StarCraft competitions
Defunct sports leagues in the United States
Quake (series) competitions